Willie Pease (30 September 1899 – 2 October 1955) was an English international footballer, who played as an outside right.

He played in the Football League for Northampton Town, Middlesbrough and Luton Town.

Early and personal life
Willie Pease was born on 30 September 1899 in Leeds. His birth name has been mis-reported as William Harold Pease. He was the second of five children.

Career
Pease began his career with Holbeck St. Barnabas before joining the Royal Northumberland Fusiliers during World War I. He signed for Leeds City as an amateur, being sold to Northampton Town (again as an amateur) in October 1919. He moved to Middlesbrough in May 1926, and to Luton Town in June 1933. A role as player-manager of Gateshead in December 1934 and a later role with Hartlepools United both fell through, and he retired in January 1935.

Pease earned one international cap for England in 1927.

Later life and death
Pease was married with three sons. After retiring as a player he entered the licensing trade; in 1939 he was the manager of a hotel in Middlesbrough, and in 1940 he was managing a hotel in Stokesley. He later ran a bed & breakfast in Redcar, where he died on 2 October 1955, aged 56, from a brain hemorrhage.

References

1899 births
1955 deaths
English footballers
England international footballers
Leeds City F.C. players
Northampton Town F.C. players
Middlesbrough F.C. players
Luton Town F.C. players
English Football League players
Association football forwards
Military personnel from Leeds
Royal Northumberland Fusiliers soldiers
British Army personnel of World War I
Footballers from Leeds